Earsay is an Israeli independent record label run by the Third Ear, a record store in Tel Aviv with branches in Jerusalem and Haifa. The label has focused on jazz and alternative music since its launch in 2000 with the release of Daniel Sarid's Cries of Disillusion.

The idea for label came from the Third Ear's general manager Eli Hayon. With the financial buffer of the record store, the label can put less emphasis on each release's profitability.

Artists
 Albert Beger
 Jet Sam
 Yoni Kretzmer
 Amir Perry
 Pollyana Frank
 Rockfour, which jumped to the label for the English-language album Supermarket
 Daniel Sarid
 Shalom Gad

References

External links
 www.third-ear.com 

Israeli record labels